Vorau is a municipality in the Hartberg-Fürstenfeld District in Styria, Austria. It is home to the Vorau Abbey.

References

Prealps East of the Mur
Cities and towns in Hartberg-Fürstenfeld District